The 215th Coastal Division was an infantry division of the Royal Italian Army during World War II. Royal Italian Army coastal divisions were second line divisions formed with reservists and equipped with second rate materiel. They were often commanded by officers called out of retirement.

History 
The division was activated on 1 August 1943 in Florence by expanding the XVI Coastal Brigade and adding the Autonomous Sector Piombino-Elba. The division was assigned to II Army Corps and based its headquarter in Massa Marittima. The division was responsible for the coastal defense of the coast of southern Tuscany from Cap San Vincenzo in San Vincenzo to Albinia. The division was also responsible for the defense of the islands of the Tuscan Archipelago and the harbor of Piombino.

After the announcement of the Armistice of Cassibile on 8 September 1943 the division's commander Cesare Maria De Vecchi authorized German forces to enter the port of Piombino and forbade to resist the invading German forces. The order was ignored by the Royal Italian Navy and army units in Piombino, which supported by the local population, fought a battle against the Germans on 10 September, that left more than 100 Germans dead and about 200 prisoners in Italian hands. The following day De Vecchi ordered to free the Germans and return their weapons to them, after which he signed the surrender of his division to the Germans.

Organization 
 215th Coastal Division, in Massa Marittima
 6th Coastal Regiment
 14th Coastal Regiment
 108th Coastal Regiment (on the island of Elba)
 4x Coastal battalions
 2x Machine gun battalions
 27th Coastal Artillery Regiment
 Coastal artillery groups (4x groups on the island of Elba)
 XIX Tank Battalion "M" (M15/42 tanks and Semovente da 75/34 self-propelled guns)
 1x Machine Gun Battalion
 518th Coastal Artillery Battery
 1300th Anti-aircraft Battery
 3rd Anti-paratroopers Unit
 207th Anti-paratroopers Unit
 215th Carabinieri Section
 131st Field Post Office
 Division Services

Commanding officers 
The division's commanding officers were:

 Generale di Divisione Cesare Maria De Vecchi (1 August 1943 - 11 September 1943)

References 

 
 

Coastal divisions of Italy
Infantry divisions of Italy in World War II